The Alura are an Aboriginal Australian people of the Northern Territory.

Country

Social organisation
According to the early ethnographer Robert Hamilton Mathews, the Alura had an eight-section class system of the type he called Wombya.

Language
There is no linguistic data available on the Alura people.

Alternative names
 Allura
 Hallurra
 Nallura

Notes

Citations

Sources

Aboriginal peoples of the Northern Territory